Kalabhavan Haneef is an Indian actor and mimicry artist in Malayalam cinema. He made his debut with the film, Sandesham (1991).

Personal life
Haneef started his mimicry activity  while his schooling, later started his career as a sales person and mimicry artist. Thereafter, he enrolled key roles in TV serials and movies for close to twenty five years in the entertainment industry.
He was closely allied with Cochin Kalabhavan which was the starting point for many super stars. Haneef has also followed the practice of Kalabhavan alumni by retaining the organization's name to his screen name. Haneef expert in mimic to actors Nedumudi Venu and Raghavan.

Haneef is extremely popular in India and abroad through his stage shows. He
has exposed smaller roles in Malayalam movies, but the television industry
welcomed him with open hands. He played important roles in serials like Minnukettu, Nadhaswaram, etc. Haneef has also been a part of shows like Abi's
Corner, Comediyum Mimicsum Pinne Njanum, Manassiloru
Mazhavillu, Tilana Tilana, etc. Minnukettu was a family drama which
portrayed the story of a father, his daughters and their struggles.

His debut film was Cheppukilukkana Changathi. He later acted in more than hundreds of
titles. . Haneef is married to Wahida on October 12, 1989, and they have two children Sharooqu Haneef and Sithara Haneef

Filmography as an actor

References

https://timesofindia.indiatimes.com/topic/Kalabhavan-Haneef

https://nettv4u.com/celebrity/malayalam/tv-actor/kalabhavan-haneef

External links
 https://www.imdb.com/name/nm3495929/

Living people
20th-century Indian male actors
Male actors in Malayalam cinema
Indian male film actors
21st-century Indian male actors
Indian male television actors
Indian male voice actors
Male actors in Malayalam television
Year of birth missing (living people)